Miloslav Hořava (born August 14, 1961) is a Czech ice hockey coach and former player.  He played on the Silver medal winning ice hockey team  at the 1984 Winter Olympics and bronze medal winning team at the 1992 Winter Olympics for Czechoslovakia.

He also played in parts of three seasons for the New York Rangers as a defenceman.

From 2002 he was working as a coach in Czech Extraliga. He was coaching HC Znojemští Orli, HC Pardubice, HC Karlovy Vary and BK Mladá Boleslav. In the beginning of the 2004–2005 season he returned to the Znojemští Orli, but in 2006 he left and started coaching Czech National U-20 Team.

On April 16, 2009, he signed a two-year contract as the new head coach for Modo Hockey of the Swedish Elitserien, a team where he also played three seasons between 1991 and 1994.

His hockey talent runs in the family. His sons Miloslav Hořava and Petr Hořava (ice hockey) are also very successful and well known hockey players.

Career statistics

Regular season and playoffs

International

External links

See also
 Ice hockey at the 1992 Winter Olympics

1961 births
Living people
Czech ice hockey coaches
Czech ice hockey defencemen
Czechoslovak ice hockey defencemen
Edmonton Oilers draft picks
Rytíři Kladno players
HC Dukla Jihlava players
HC Slavia Praha players
HC Karlovy Vary players
HC Litvínov players
Ice hockey players at the 1984 Winter Olympics
Ice hockey players at the 1988 Winter Olympics
Ice hockey players at the 1992 Winter Olympics
Ice hockey players at the 1994 Winter Olympics
Medalists at the 1984 Winter Olympics
Medalists at the 1992 Winter Olympics
Modo Hockey players
New York Rangers players
Olympic bronze medalists for Czechoslovakia
Olympic ice hockey players of Czechoslovakia
Olympic ice hockey players of the Czech Republic
Olympic medalists in ice hockey
Olympic silver medalists for Czechoslovakia
Sportspeople from Kladno
Czech expatriate ice hockey players in Slovakia
Czechoslovak expatriate sportspeople in the United States
Czechoslovak expatriate sportspeople in Sweden
Czechoslovak expatriate ice hockey people
Expatriate ice hockey players in Sweden
Expatriate ice hockey players in the United States
Czech expatriate ice hockey players in Sweden